One Mississippi may refer to:

One Mississippi (Brendan Benson album), 1996
One Mississippi (J Church album), 2000
One Mississippi (TV series), a 2016 American television series
"One Mississippi", a song on the 2003 album Jillbilly by Jill King
"One Mississippi", a song on the 2013 album Bring You Back by Brett Eldredge
"One Mississippi", a song on the 2017 album So Good by Zara Larsson
"One Mississippi", a song on the 2020 album My Mississippi Reunion by Steve Azar
"One Mississippi", a 2021 song by Kane Brown